Yalbandan-e Sara (also Romanized as Yālbandān-e Sarā; also known as Yālbandānsarā) is a village in Kelarabad Rural District, Kelarabad District, Abbasabad County, Mazandaran Province, Iran. At the 2006 census, its population was 232, in 65 families.

References 

Populated places in Abbasabad County